Aurimas Vilkaitis (born 11 February 1993) is a Lithuanian professional footballer who plays as a centre-back.

External links

Living people
1993 births
Sportspeople from Jonava
Association football central defenders
Lithuanian footballers
Lithuanian expatriate footballers
Expatriate footballers in Italy
Serie A players
S.S. Lazio players
Lithuania under-21 international footballers
Lithuania international footballers